Mindelact is a theatrical association in Mindelo on the island of São Vicente, Cape Verde.  Each year, it organizes the Mindelo Theatrical Festival (Festival do Teatro do Mindelo)

When the association was founded in 1996 by Elisângelo Ramos and Portuguese actor João Branco, it was the most popular in Cape Verde along with its festival, today it is the second most important and is Barlavento's most important theatrical festival.  Several plays were performed with the Grupo de Teatro do Centro Cultural Português do Mindelo, founded in 1993, two years before the foundation of Mindelact.

In 2001, the association celebrated its 5th anniversary of its foundation and in 2006, its 10th anniversary.

Heads
João Branco, 1996-2013

Mindelo Theatrical Festival
Its first edition was made in 1995.  The festival today is considered one of the most important event in African theater. As of 2016, it had recently done 22 editions of the festival.

One of the plays performed in one of the early editions were Cuscujada by Sergio Frusoni.

I (1st) - 1995 - First edition
XIX (19th) - 2013: 50th performance of The Tempest (Tempestade, ALUPEK: Tempestadi)
XX (20th) - 2014: Appearances: Mel Gambôa

Plays performed by the GTCCPM
Several plays were performed before Mindelact was founded in 1996.  Some of the plays are world renowned and some of them are Capeverdean.  One of the actors and performers included João Branco.

1991: Quem me dera ser Onda, novel by Mário Rui - GTCCP
1993: Fome de 47 - unknown author
1993: A Estátua e Etc. - collective text
1994: Our Fisherman (Nos Pescadores) - collective text
1994: Chico - collective text
1995: Gin Tonic Surrealist - partly by Mário Henrique Leiria
1996: Adaptation of a book by Oscar Wilde
1997 and 2007: A play, an adaptation of a book by Garcia Lorca
1998: Romeo and Juliet by William Shakespeare
1999: Os dois irmãos, adaptation of a novel by Germano Almeida
1999: Figa Canhota, collective text
1999: Catchupa, collective text
2000: Agravos de um Artista, adaptation of a short story by Germano Almeida
2001: Count of Abranhos, adaption of a book by Eça de Queirós
2002: Salon by Mário Lúcio Sousa
2003: King Lear by William Shakespeare, co-produced with Atelier Teatrakácia
2004: Tertúlia, based on the poems
2005: High Seas - a poem by Mrozek and Eugénio Tavares
2006: "Women of Lajinha" ("Mulheres na Lajinha"), a part of the novel O mar na Lajinha by Germano Almeida
2007: A Caderneta, by Baltasar Lopes da Silva
2009: The Fire (No Inferno), based on a book by Arménio Vieira
2009: O Jardim do Dr. Gordner Brickers, by Caplan Neves
2012: Stand Up Comedy Pará Moss, collective texts with Trupe Pará (Pará Troop)
2012: Theory of Silence (Teorema do Silêncio) by Caplan Neves
2012: As Mindelenses (The Mindelians, sometimes as Gramportians) - collective texts with Trupe Pará (Pará Troop)
2013: Sete Pequenas Peça, Para Sete Grandes Crises - collective text with Trupe Pará (Pará Troop)
2013: The Tempest by William Shakespeare
2016 - Strangers by José Luis Peixoto'', co-produced with Teatro Rivoli in Porto, Portugal

References

External links

GTCCPM's website 

Mindelo
Entertainment in Cape Verde
Culture of São Vicente, Cape Verde
1996 establishments in Cape Verde